Nasser Beydoun is an American business executive. He is the former chief executive officer of the Qatar-based Wataniya Restaurants group. Beydoun has served as the executive director of the Arab American Chamber of Commerce and as chair of the Arab American Civil Rights League. He was the first Arab American liaison to the Arab League.

Early life 
Beydoun was born in Beirut to Najla and Mohamed Beydoun. His family was from Bint Jbeil and his grandfather represented the town in Lebanon's parliament. Beydoun's great-grandfather had already immigrated to the United States and worked for Ford Motor Company in Highland Park, Michigan. Beydoun's grandfather remained in Lebanon but his father, Mohamed, immigrated to Detroit in 1969 when Beydoun was five years old. Mohamed worked at Ford and raised six children.

Education 

In 1987, he moved to California. Beydoun completed a bachelor's and master's degree in business administration at the University of San Diego. He tried opening several business including a tortilla factory. He returned to Michigan in 1999 and in 2000, be became the executive director of the Arab American Chamber of Commerce. In 2001, he was appointed by Amr Moussa as the first Arab American liaison to the Arab League.

Career 

By 2005, he was a construction company executive based in Wayne County, Michigan. In 2005, he considered running as a GOP candidate in the 2006 United States Senate election in Michigan. He has a history of political donations to both Republican and Democratic officeholders. In 2007, he was hired by Wataniya Restaurants group as its chief executive officer and moved to Qatar. He worked on expanding outlets of Caribou Coffee, Rainforest Cafe, and Sbarro in Qatar, Dubai, and Egypt. He resigned in November 2009. He was later stuck in the country for 15 months after his employer and sponsor denied his exit permit.

Beydoun has served as chair of the Arab American Civil Rights League. He is a former trustee of the Henry Ford College foundation. Beydoun was co-chair of BRIDGES, a federal law enforcement partnership with the Arab American and Middle Eastern communities in Metro Detroit.

In December 2022, Beydoun established an exploratory committee ahead of the 2024 United States Senate election in Michigan.

Beydoun married Maysa Beydoun, a Canadian of Lebanese descent and had three children. He later married Nancy Jaafar.

References 

Living people
Year of birth missing (living people)
Politicians from Beirut
21st-century American businesspeople
University of San Diego alumni
American chief executives
Lebanese emigrants to the United States
21st-century American politicians
Michigan Democrats
People from Bint Jbeil District
Businesspeople from Michigan
Businesspeople from Beirut
Arab League people